Turmakhand (Nepali: तुर्माखाँद ) is a Rural Municipality in Achham District in the Sudurpashchim Province of far-western Nepal. Turmakhand has the population of 24940. The area of turmakhand  is 232.07 km2.

It was formed by merging Bhairabsthan, Turmakhad, Nada, Raniban, Toshi and Dhamali VDCs.

The municipality was declared Chau Goth free in 2019 which is a tradition to force women stay in barn in her mensuration cycle.

References

Rural municipalities in Achham District
Rural municipalities of Nepal established in 2017